Phelps-A-Thon.com is a Boston-based, pro-LGBT website working to counteract the message spread by the Westboro Baptist Church, (WBC) and their leader, Fred Phelps. It works by channelling passions against WBC into donations for groups targeted by the WBC's pickets.

Phelps-A-Thon.com assists groups that are being picketed by WBC in setting up a Telethon type of counter-protest. Through the "Phelps-A-Thon.com" website, supporters can pledge online to donate a certain amount of money for every minute of WBC pickets against a specific target, usually LGBT or Jewish groups. The longer they protest, the more money they raise for the cause that they are demonstrating against.

History 
Phelps-A-Thon.com is run by LGBTQ+ activist, Chris Mason. The website arose when Fred Phelps from the Westboro Baptist Church came to Boston to protest a local production of The Laramie Project. The event raised over $4,600 for the pro-LGBT project, Driving Equality. After this first Phelps-A-Thon, people from around the country, upon learning they were going to be picketed by WBC, started contacting Chris, asking for help in setting up their own Phelps-A-Thons. The Phelps-A-Thon.com website  was created in an effort to helps local activists conduct the counter-protests in their own communities.

During a trek across the country to promote LGBT equality, Chris Mason, founder of Phelps-A-Thon.com stopped in Topeka, Kansas to visit the Westboro Baptist Church in October 2010. Concealing his activist identity, he sat down for a conversation with Shirley Phelps-Roper, the daughter of Fred Phelps, to get a better understanding of the group's mission. In a video clip of the interview, Chris asks Shirley her opinion of the Phelps-A-Thon counter-protests.

References

External links 
 Phelps-A-Thon.com
 YouTube - Chris Mason interviews Shirley Phelps of the Westboro Baptist Church

Westboro Baptist Church
LGBT in Massachusetts